The Little Blue River  is a  river in southern Nebraska and northern Kansas that was used by Pony Express horseback riders.  Ridgelines of this historic watershed defined the wagon train routes first used by Oregon Trail emigrants.

The Little Blue rises just south of Minden in Kearney County, Nebraska.  It flows east-southeast past Hebron and Fairbury, Nebraska, and Marysville, Kansas. It joins the Big Blue River at Blue Rapids, Kansas.

The waters of Little Blue River, once noted for the namesake blueish tint, were later muddied by silt runoff from plowing. Various other rivers also have the name "Little Blue River".

See also
List of rivers of Kansas
List of rivers of Nebraska

References

External links
Nebraska DNR entry on river
Andreas' History of the State of Nebraska on river

Rivers of Kansas
Rivers of Nebraska
Rivers of Kearney County, Nebraska
Rivers of Thayer County, Nebraska
Rivers of Jefferson County, Nebraska
Tributaries of the Kansas River
Rivers of Marshall County, Kansas